Adrien Saddier (born 15 May 1992) is a French professional golfer currently playing on the European Tour.

Saddier turned professional in 2013. He earned his card on the European Tour for 2014 by playing all three stages of qualifying school. His best finish on tour in the 2014 season was T-6 at the Nelson Mandela Championship in December 2013. He finished 127th on the Race to Dubai and played primarily on the Challenge Tour from 2015 to 2017. In 2016, Saddier won the Fred Olsen Challenge de España on the Challenge Tour for his first professional win. Saddier finished the 2016 season just outside the top 15 in the Order of Merit but three runner-up finishes during the 2017 season put him 13th in the Order of Merit to earn a place on the European Tour for 2018.

Amateur wins
2010 Grand Prix de Montpellier Massane
2011 French Team Cup (individual), European Club Trophy (individual)
2012 Swiss International Amateur, Grand Prix de Savoie, European Club Trophy (individual)
2013 European Nations Cup (individual), Grand Prix de Haute Savoie, Internationaux de France – Coupe Murat

Source:

Professional wins (1)

Challenge Tour wins (1)

Challenge Tour playoff record (0–1)

Team appearances
Amateur
European Amateur Team Championship (representing France): 2013

See also
2013 European Tour Qualifying School graduates
2017 Challenge Tour graduates
2019 European Tour Qualifying School graduates
2022 European Tour Qualifying School graduates

References

External links
 

French male golfers
European Tour golfers
Sportspeople from Haute-Savoie
Sportspeople from Savoie
People from Aix-les-Bains
1992 births
Living people